Was ist des Deutschen Vaterland is a  German nationalist song by Ernst Moritz Arndt (1813) which was popular in the 19th century.

History 
In the text, Arndt asks the German question and answers it by demanding a Greater German nation-state comprising all German-speaking areas in Europe. The song was performed for the first time in Berlin in 1814.

As the original tune did not become popular, Gustav Reichardt wrote a new melody in 1825. This new tune made the song very popular among the German population that desired the transformation of the German Confederation into a united empire, instead of the previous situation where there were multiple duchies.

Joachim Raff used Reichhardt's tune as a leitmotif in his symphony An das Vaterland.

In 1911, Emil Sembritzki, wrote a song known as "Was ist des Deutschen Tochterland?", which used the 1825 tune and embraced German colonialism.

Lyrics 
Arndt enumerates German states and regions and asks whether these particular areas are the fatherland of all Germans. He immediately replies with ″no″ and finally concludes that no particular state or states can be the German fatherland, which is understood to be the entirety of predominantly German-speaking areas.

References

External links 
Des Deutschen Vaterland on YouTube
Was ist des Deutschen Vaterland (Detailed with translation and map) on YouTube

German patriotic songs
German music
German culture
German nationalism
Songs about Germany
19th-century songs
Year of song unknown